John Anton Posewitz (August 9, 1906 – April 11, 1994) was an American professional basketball player. He played for the Sheboygan Red Skins in the National Basketball League and averaged 2.4 points per game. He was the brother of professional basketball player Scoop Posewitz.

He also played minor league baseball. Teams included the Waynesboro Red Birds (1930), Springfield Red Wings (1931), Elmira Red Wings (1932), and the Mobile Red Warriors (1932).

References

1906 births
1994 deaths
American men's basketball players
Baseball players from Wisconsin
Basketball players from Wisconsin
Elmira Red Wings players
Guards (basketball)
Mobile Red Warriors players
Sheboygan Red Skins players
Sportspeople from Sheboygan, Wisconsin
Springfield Red Wings players
Waynesboro Red Birds players